Sir Patrick Stewart is an English actor of the stage and screen.

He has received numerous awards and nominations for his work on theatre, and television. Stewart was nominated for the Tony Award for Best Actor in a Play for his performance in the Broadway revival of William Shakespeare's Macbeth. He also received three Drama Desk Award nominations winning in 1992 for his performance in Charles Dickens' A Christmas Story. He also received two Laurence Olivier Awards out of five nominations for his performance in the Shakespeare tragedies Antony and Cleopatra (1979) and Hamlet (2009). He also received two Outer Critics Circle Awards for The Tempest, and Macbeth. For his work on television he received three Golden Globe Award nominations, three Screen Actors Guild Award nominations and four Primetime Emmy Award nominations. Stewart has also received three Grammy Award nominations winning in 1996.

Major associations

Golden Globe Awards

Grammy Awards

Primetime Emmy Awards

Screen Actors Guild Awards

Tony Awards

Theatre awards

Drama Desk Awards

Olivier Awards

Outer Critics Circle Award

Critics awards

Miscellaneous awards

Saturn Awards

San Diego International Film Festival

References 

Lists of awards received by British actor